Happiness Is is a 1966 LP by Ray Conniff. The title track, and single, "Happiness Is" is a song written by Paul Parnes and Paul Evans, a modified version of the song was later used for four years as an advertising jingle for Kent cigarettes.

Track listing
"Happiness Is" (Paul Evans, Paul Parnes)
"Midnight Lace", Pt. 1 (Joe Lubin)
"Miss You" (Charles Tobias, Harry Tobias)
"Popsy" (D. James)
"Melodie d'Amour" (Leonardo Johns, Henri Salvador)
"You Stepped Out of a Dream" (Nacio Herb Brown, Gus Kahn)
"Jamaica Farewell" (Lord Burgess)
"Blue Moon" (Richard Rodgers, Lorenz Hart)
"If I Knew Then" (Charles Tobias, Harry Tobias)
"The Sheik of Araby" (Harry B. Smith, Ted Snyder, Francis Wheeler)
"All by Myself" (Irving Berlin)
"Sweet Sue, Just You Will" (Will J. Harris and Victor Young)

References

1966 albums
Ray Conniff albums